Alexa Davies is a Welsh actress best known for her roles as Aretha in Raised by Wolves, Kate in Detectorists and Yvonne in Cradle to Grave, and as young Rosie in Mamma Mia! Here We Go Again.

She grew up in Rhyl, Denbighshire.

Filmography

Film

Television

References

External links
 
 

1995 births
Welsh television actresses
Welsh film actresses
People from Rhyl
Living people
21st-century Welsh actresses